The Alberta Association of Architects published their Chronicle of Significant Alberta Architecture in February 2003 (Phase One) and August 2005 (Phase 2). The project's main goal was to ensure that the public, as well as those with a professional interest in the subject, could easily identify architecturally significant structures developed and still standing in Alberta. The project was undertaken in association with the Government of Alberta (Phase 1 associated with the ministry of Employment, Immigration and Industry and Phase 2 associated with ministry of Economic Development).

Significant structures by location

Calgary

 Animal Services Centre
 Bankers Hall
 Barron Building
 Bearspaw House
 Brentwood LRT Station
 Calgary Board of Education, Education Centre
 Calgary Centennial Planetarium
 Calgary Drop-in & Rehab Centre
 Calgary International Airport
 Canada Olympic Park (Paskapoo)
 Calgary Real Estate Board
 Calgary Tower (Husky Tower)
 Centre of Hope, Salvation Army
 Christchurch
 Coach House/Maisonneuve
 Connaught Gardens
 Destination Africa, Calgary Zoo
 Franklin House
 Glenmore Water Treatment Complex
 Grain Exchange
 Hudson's Bay Store #4
 ICT Building, University of Calgary
 Lindsay Park Aquatic Centre (now MNP Community & Sport Centre)
 Lougheed Building & Grand Theatre
 McDougall Centre
 Millennium Landmark
 Native Addictions Centre
 NewZones Gallery of Contemporary Art
 Nortel Wireless Communications Plant
 NOVA Corp
 Olympic Saddledome
 Olympic Speed Skating Oval, University of Calgary
 Renfrew Education Services, Main School
 Rockyview General Hospital
 Rosedale House
 Rozsa Centre, University of Calgary
 St. Andrew's United Church
 St. Mary's Roman Catholic Cathedral
 St. Stephen's Byzantine Ukrainian Catholic Church
 Shaw Court
 Shouldice Change Pavilion
 Southern Alberta Institute of Technology 2001 Project
 Sydenham House
 Transalta Corporate Headquarters
 Urban House III

Edmonton

 Advanced Technology Centre, 9650 20 Avenue NW
 Alberta Heart Institute
 Alberta Legislative Assembly
 Boys & Girls Club, West Edmonton Centre, 16030 104 Avenue NW
 Canada Post Bulk Mail Facility (Edmonton Mail Processing Plant), 12135 149 Street
 Citadel Theatre, 99 Street and 102A Avenue NW
 City of Edmonton Police Headquarters, 9620 103A Ave NW
 Coronation Swimming Pool (renamed Peter Hemingway Fitness and Leisure Centre), 13808 111 Avenue NW
 Edmonton City Hall, 1 Sir Winston Churchill Square NW
 Hotel Macdonald, 10065 100 Street NW
 Garneau Student Housing, 88 Avenue and 110 Street NW
 MacEwan University city centre campus, northwest of 104 Avenue and 105 Street NW
 Housing Union Building (HUB) student residence, 9005 112 Street, University of Alberta
 Intuit CBIP Designated Green Building, 7008 Roper Road
 Muttart Conservatory, 9626 96A Street NW
 Nilex Inc., 9304 39 Avenue NW
 Rutherford House, 11153 Saskatchewan Drive NW
 Stanley Engineering Building, Kingsway Avenue NW
 Telus Centre for Professional Development, University of Alberta, 87 Avenue and 111 Street NW
 Telus Plaza Redevelopment Project, 10025 Jasper Avenue NW
 Walter C. MacKenzie Health Sciences Centre, 8440 112 Street NW
 West Jasper Place Transit Centre, 87 Avenue west of 170 Street NW
 Winspear Centre, 9720 102 Avenue NW

Banff
 Banff Park Museum
 Banff Springs Hotel redevelopment
 Banff Town Hall
 Cave & Basin
 Composer's Studio E
 Fairmont Banff Springs Hotel Golf Club House
 Sally Borden Building

Northern Alberta
 Driftpile K4-Grade 12 School, Driftpile
 Grand Prairie Regional College, Grand Prairie
 Saddle Lake Jr/Sr High School, Saddle Lake

Central Alberta

 Collicut Leisure Centre, Red Deer
 Ermineskin Junior/Senior High School, Maskwacis
 Hobbema Healing Lodge (Pe Sakastew), Maskwacis
 Ponoka Town Hall, Ponoka
 St. Albert Place, 5 St. Anne Street, St. Albert
 St. Mary's Roman Catholic Church, Red Deer

Southern Alberta

 Alberta Temple, Church of Christ, Latter Day Saints, Cardston
 Black House, Lethbridge
 Fooks House, Lethbridge
 Haig House, Lethbridge
 Head-Smashed-In Buffalo Jump Interpretive Centre, Fort Macleod
 House for Whale Watchers, Canmore
 Lethbridge City Hall, Lethbridge
 Medicine Hat City Hall, Medicine Hat
 Post Hotel, Lake Louise
 Prince of Wales Hotel, Waterton Lake
 Royal Tyrrell Museum of Palaeontology, Drumheller
 SMED Falkridge Corporate Retreat, Priddis
 University of Lethbridge, Lethbridge
 University of Lethbridge Library Information Network Centre (LINC), Lethbridge

See also
 List of attractions and landmarks in Calgary
 List of attractions and landmarks in Edmonton
 Heritage buildings in Edmonton
 Canadian architecture

References 

Edmonton-related lists